"No One" is a song recorded by American pop rock duo Aly & AJ for their debut album Into the Rush. The song was released digitally as the second single from the aforementioned album on March 18, 2005. It was later included on Radio Disney's playlist, to promote Into the Rush. The song was also used during the main titles of the Walt Disney Pictures film Ice Princess.

Music video 
Even though of being a Radio Disney-only single, a video was still made to promote the album and film. The clips includes some of the major parts from the Walt Disney Pictures film Ice Princess, intertwined with parts containing Aly & AJ. The sisters are shown in a house playing their guitars and singing.

Track listings

Release history

References 

2005 singles
Aly & AJ songs
Pop ballads
Hollywood Records singles
Songs written by Aly Michalka
Songs written by AJ Michalka